Buchanania platyneura is a species of flowering plant in the family Anacardiaceae. It is endemic to India and has been classified as "vulnerable".

References

platyneura
Endemic flora of India (region)
Vulnerable plants
Taxonomy articles created by Polbot